Lambha is a census town in Ahmadabad district in the Indian state of Gujarat. Parts of Vejalpur, Daskroi, Danilimda, Vatva, and Maninagar assembly constituencies jut into Lambha. Many parts of Kheda, Gandhinagar, Ahmedabad West, and Ahmedabad East Lok Sabha constituencies fall in Lambha.

Demographics
 India census, Lambha had a population of 16,725. Males constitute 54% of the population and females 46%. Lambha has an average literacy rate of 72%, higher than the national average of 59.5%: male literacy is 79%, and female literacy is 63%. In Lambha, 13% of the population is under 6 years of age.

Since year 2007, Lambha is considered a part of Ahmedabad. AMC (Amdavad Municipal Corporation) has covered almost all of the areas beyond Sardar Patel Ring Road. Previously, it was one of the rural areas, but now it is considered as urban.

Lambha is well known for the Baliyadev Temple which is under New BaliyaKaka Property Trust. It has one lake which is under development as new Auda TP scheme. There are four schools (Including one English medium and One Government school) in the Area near Lambha.

There are few societies namely  Shreeji Park, Gayatri, Shreenath soc. , Narsinh Nagar, Ambalika etc.. developed in lamha near BaliyaDev Temple .

AMC has started their work for developing 4 Lane road from the NH 8 to the Village which is under process as on date 30-09-2013. Due to the development in Ahmedabad, land rate in Lambha has increased.

References

Cities and towns in Ahmedabad district
Neighbourhoods in Ahmedabad